Fabrício Neis and Caio Zampieri were the defending champions but only Neis chose to defend his title, partnering Máximo González. Neis successfully defended his title.

González and Neis won the title after defeating Gastão Elias and José Pereira 6–1, 6–1 in the final.

Seeds

Draw

References
 Main Draw

São Paulo Challenger de Tênis - Doubles
2017 Doubles